Tatia Gabunia (born 7 July 2000) is a Georgian footballer, who plays as a goalkeeper for Amed SFK, and 
and has appeared for the Georgia women's national team.

Club career 
Gabunia played in her country for KSK Lanchkhuti. End December 2022,  she moved to Turkey, and signed with the Diyarbakur-based culb Amed SFK to play in the second half of the 2022–23 Super League.

International career 
Gabunia has been capped for the Georgia national team, appearing for the team during the UEFA Women's Euro 2021 qualifying cycle.

References

External links 
 
 
 

2000 births
Living people
Women's footballers from Georgia (country)
Women's association football goalkeepers
Georgia (country) women's international footballers
Expatriate sportspeople from Georgia (country) in Turkey
Expatriate women's footballers in Turkey
Turkish Women's Football Super League players
Amed S.K. (women) players